Stadion Evžena Rošického, also known simply as Strahov, is a multi-purpose stadium in Strahov, Prague in the Czech Republic.  It hosted the 1978 European Athletics Championships and for many years this was the venue for main annual international track and field meet of Prague (Evžen Rošický Memorial and later Josef Odložil Memorial) until Stadion Juliska took the role in 2002. Nowadays the stadium is used only for minor domestic athletic competitions and mostly for football matches, although no team plays at the stadium regularly. It served as the home ground for SK Slavia Prague from August 2000 until May 2008 when their new stadium, the Synot Tip Arena, was opened. It is also occasionally used by other Czech teams, and is the usual venue for the Czech Cup final. Currently, it is the home stadium of FK Slavoj Vyšehrad of the Czech National Football League.

The stadium holds 19,032 spectators. Stadion Evžena Rošického is adjacent to the considerably larger Strahov Stadium, the second biggest in the world.

It is named after Czech athlete and anti-Nazi resistant Evžen Rošický, executed by the Nazis in 1942.

Club football 
Sparta Prague played here at the end of the 2000–01 season due to the installation of under-soil heating at their stadium. Viktoria Žižkov played European matches here in the 2001–02 UEFA Cup and 2002–03 UEFA Cup. Sparta Krč played its home matches here in the 2007–08 Czech 2. Liga. Sparta's reserves played here for two seasons, in the 2008–09 Czech 2. Liga and 2009–10 Czech 2. Liga.

In the 2009–10 season, Bohemians Prague used Stadion Evžena Rošického as its home stadium. Additionally, SK Kladno and Bohemians 1905 both played one home match here in March 2010 due to under-soil heating concerns at their own stadia, after the winter break.

In October 2011, Dukla Prague played a match here while work was done on their under-soil heating and seating installation in the 2011–12 Czech First League. By doing so, Dukla became the ninth team to play a home match at Strahov in ten years.

Other services 

Stadion Evžena Rošického is also an important location for many FM radio station transmitters that cover the Prague region, including Radio Beat and BBC Radio Service.

International matches
Stadion Evžena Rošického has hosted two friendly matches of the Czech Republic national football team

See also 
List of football stadiums in the Czech Republic

References

External links 

 Photo gallery and data at Erlebnis-Stadion.de

Football venues in Prague
Athletics (track and field) venues in the Czech Republic
Czech First League venues
Multi-purpose stadiums in the Czech Republic
Sports venues completed in 1935
1935 establishments in Czechoslovakia
Venues of the Friendship Games
20th-century architecture in the Czech Republic